Frank E. Schneider (August 11, 1926 – November 11, 2018) was a stock car, modified, midget, and sprint car racer. He had one NASCAR Grand National Series victory at Old Dominion Speedway in 1958 driving a 1957 Chevrolet. He also won the 1952 NASCAR modified title, where it is suspected that he scored at least 100 wins. Schneider earned his nickname "The Old Master" through his ability to master anything with wheels.

Career
Schneider began his career on June 15, 1947, by winning $70 ($ when considering inflation) for driving his streetcar to a seventh-place at Flemington Speedway. Schneider is believed to have won at least 750 races in the next thirty years. He routinely raced in several classes at eight races per week. He reportedly scored at least 100 wins again in 1958.  Schneider won the Langhorne National Open, the country's top event for Sportsman and Modified racers in 1954 and 1962.  In 1963, he won four track points championships—Middletown, Harmony, Reading, and Nazareth—in a car he bought for $1,000 ($ when considering inflation).

He scored his last feature win on July 31, 1977, at the 1/2-mile dirt track Nazareth Speedway. Although he competed in almost all 50 states, the Bahamas, and Canada, Schneider raced most of his career at the Orange County Fair Speedway, Reading Fairgrounds, Flemington Speedway, Harmony Speedway, and Nazareth Speedway.  The Northeast Dirt Modified Hall of Fame inducted Schneider in 1992 as part of its inaugural class.  He was recently voted driver of the century by Area Auto Racing News.

Schneider's career is the subject of the video "The Old Master: Frankie Schneider". Schneider died at the age of 92 on November 11, 2018.

Early life

Frank E. Schneider was born on August 11, 1926, in Maplewood, New Jersey, not far from Newark.  His father, Frank Sr, was employed at the Western Electric Company in Newark at the time.  Frank is the oldest of 5 children, Eleanor, Lorraine, Robert, and Charles are his younger siblings.  He left home when he was 16 and he started racing cars when he was 21.

References

 "The Old Master, the Frankie Schneider Story" The Old Master

External links

Eastern Motorsports Press Association

1926 births
2018 deaths
ARCA Menards Series drivers
NASCAR drivers
People from Maplewood, New Jersey
Sportspeople from Essex County, New Jersey
Racing drivers from New Jersey
USAC Silver Crown Series drivers
USAC Stock Car drivers